Bai Shuo (born 6 January 1995) is a Chinese footballer currently playing as a goalkeeper for Chinese club Shizuishan Hengxing.

Career statistics

Club
.

Notes

References

1995 births
Living people
Sportspeople from Shijiazhuang
Footballers from Hebei
Chinese footballers
Association football goalkeepers
China League Two players
Tianjin Jinmen Tiger F.C. players
Shanghai Shenhua F.C. players
Shanghai JuJu Sports F.C. players
Inner Mongolia Caoshangfei F.C. players
Chinese expatriate footballers
Chinese expatriate sportspeople in Spain
Expatriate footballers in Spain
21st-century Chinese people